William Barker (31 May 1924 – 2002) was an English footballer who played in the Football League for Stoke City.

Career
Barker played for Stoke City and made one appearance for Stoke in the Football League which came in a 1–1 draw away at Manchester City during the 1949–50 season. He failed to make the grade at Stoke and decided to pursue a different career.

Career statistics

References

English footballers
Stoke City F.C. players
English Football League players
1924 births
2002 deaths
Association football forwards